Alexander Gordon Higgins (18 March 1949 – 24 July 2010) was a Northern Irish professional snooker player and a two-time world champion who is remembered as one of the most iconic figures in the sport's history. Nicknamed "Hurricane Higgins" for his rapid play, and known as the "People's Champion" for his popularity and charisma, he is often credited as a key factor in snooker's success as a mainstream televised sport in the 1980s.  

Higgins turned professional in 1971 and won the World Snooker Championship in 1972, defeating John Spencer 37–31 in the final to become the first qualifier to win the world title, a feat that only two other players—Terry Griffiths in 1979 and Shaun Murphy in 2005—have achieved since. Aged 22, he was then the sport's youngest world champion, a record he held until 21-year-old Stephen Hendry won the title in 1990. Runner-up to Ray Reardon and Cliff Thorburn respectively in the world championships of 1976 and 1980, Higgins defeated Jimmy White 16–15 in the 1982 semi-finals, producing a 69 clearance in the penultimate frame that is regarded as one of the greatest breaks in the sport's history. He went on to defeat Reardon 18–15 in the final to win his second world title ten years after his first. Images of a tearful Higgins holding his baby daughter after his 1982 victory are regarded as some of the most iconic in the history of British televised sport.  

Higgins won Masters titles in 1978 and 1981 and won the UK Championship in 1983, where he recovered from 0–7 behind to defeat Steve Davis 16–15 in the final. As of 2023, he is one of 11 players to have completed a career Triple Crown. He won the World Doubles Championship with White in 1984 and played with Dennis Taylor and Eugene Hughes on the all-Ireland team that won the World Cup three consecutive times from 1985–87. He won his last professional title at the 1989 Irish Masters, defeating Hendry 9–8 in the final. 

Remembered for his turbulent lifestyle, Higgins was a lifelong heavy smoker, struggled with drinking and gambling, and admitted to using cocaine and marijuana. He had tempestuous relationships with women—both his marriages ended in divorce, and he had widely publicised altercations with other girlfriends, one of whom stabbed him three times during a domestic argument. Known as an unpredictable, difficult, and volatile character, he was often disciplined by the sport's governing body, most notably when he was fined £12,000 and banned for five tournaments in 1986 after head-butting an official, and banned again for the entire 1990–91 season after punching another official and threatening to have Taylor shot. Higgins retired from the professional tour in 1997. Diagnosed with throat cancer the following year, he died of multiple causes in his Belfast home on 24 July 2010, aged 61.

Life and career

Early life

Alex Higgins was born in Belfast on 18 March 1949. He started playing snooker at the age of 11, often in the Jampot club in his native Sandy Row area of south Belfast and later in the YMCA in the nearby city centre. At age 14, he left for England and a career as a jockey. However, he never made the grade because he was too heavy to ride competitively. He returned to Belfast and by 1965, aged 16, he had compiled his first maximum break. In 1968 he won the Northern Ireland Amateur Snooker Championship, by defeating Maurice Gill 4–1 in the final. In doing so he broke two records - he was the first player to win the tournament at his first appearance and, aged 18, became the youngest winner of the tournament. One week later, he won the All-Ireland Amateur Championship, defeating Gerry Hanway of Inchicore 4–1 in the final at Mountpottinger YMCA. The following year he lost his Northern Ireland Amateur crown, losing 0–4 to Dessie Anderson in the 1969 final.

World titles
Higgins turned professional at the age of 22, winning the World Championship at his first attempt in 1972, beating John Spencer 37–31. Higgins was the youngest-ever winner of the title, a record he held until Stephen Hendry's 1990 victory at the age of 21. In April 1976, Higgins reached the final again and faced Ray Reardon. Higgins led 10–9 but faded over the stretch. In a match marred by erratic refereeing and a sub-standard table, Reardon nevertheless pulled away to win the title for the fifth time, with the score finishing at 27–16. Higgins was also the runner-up to Cliff Thorburn in 1980, losing 18–16, after being 9–5 up. Higgins won the world title for a second time in 1982 after beating Reardon 18–15 (with a 135 total clearance in the final frame); it was an emotional as well as professional victory for him. Higgins would have been ranked No. 1 in the world rankings for the 1982/83 season had he not forfeited ranking points following disciplinary action.

Other victories
Throughout his career, Higgins won 20 other titles, one of the most notable being the 1983 UK Championship. In the final he trailed Steve Davis 0–7 before producing a famous comeback to win 16–15. He also won the Masters twice, in 1978 and in 1981, beating Cliff Thorburn (a man who, at one point, floored Higgins with one swift punch ) and Terry Griffiths in the finals respectively. Another notable victory was his final professional triumph in the 1989 Irish Masters at the age of 40 when he defeated a young Stephen Hendry. This was the last professional tournament he won, and is often referred to as "The Hurricane's Last Hurrah".

Post-retirement
After his retirement from the professional game, Higgins spent time playing for small sums of money in and around Northern Ireland. He made appearances in the 2005 and 2006 Irish Professional Championship, these comebacks ending in first-round defeats by Garry Hardiman and Joe Delaney, respectively.

On 12 June 2007, it was reported that Higgins had assaulted a referee at a charity match in the north-east of England. Higgins returned to competitive action in September 2007 at the Irish Professional Championship in Dublin but was whitewashed 0–5 by former British Open champion Fergal O'Brien in the first round at the Spawell Club, Templeogue.

Higgins continued to play fairly regularly, and enjoyed "hustling" all comers for small-time stakes in clubs in Northern Ireland and beyond; in May 2009 he entered the Northern Ireland Amateur Championship, "to give it a crack", but failed to appear for his match.

On 8 April 2010, Higgins was part of the debut Snooker Legends Tour event in Sheffield, at the Crucible. Appearing alongside other retired or close-to-retiring professionals, including John Parrott, Jimmy White, John Virgo and Cliff Thorburn, he faced Thorburn in his match, but lost 2–0.

It is estimated that Higgins earned and spent £3–4 million in his career as a snooker player.

Playing style
Higgins's speed around the table, his ability to pot balls at a rapid rate and flamboyant style earned him the nickname "Hurricane Higgins" and made him a very high-profile player. His highly unusual cueing technique sometimes included a body swerve and movement, as well as a stance that was noticeably higher than that of most professionals.

The unorthodox play of Higgins was encapsulated in his break of 69, made under extreme pressure, against Jimmy White in the penultimate frame of their World Professional Snooker Championship semi-final in 1982. Higgins was 0–59 down in that frame, but managed to compile an extremely challenging clearance during which he was scarcely in position until the colours. In particular, former world champion Dennis Taylor considers a three-quarter-ball pot on a blue into the green pocket especially memorable, not only for its extreme degree of difficulty but for enabling Higgins to continue the break and keep White off the table and unable to clinch victory at that moment. In potting the blue, Higgins screwed the cue-ball on to the side cushion to bring it back towards the black/pink area with extreme left-hand sidespin, a shot Taylor believes could be played 100 times without coming close to the position Higgins reached with cue-ball. He went a little too far for ideal position on his next red but the match-saving break was still alive.

Controversy and behaviour

Higgins drank alcohol and smoked during tournaments, as did many of his contemporaries. A volatile personality got him into frequent fights and arguments, both on and off the snooker table. One of the most serious of these clashes was when he head-butted a tournament official at the UK championship in 1986 after an argument. This incident saw Higgins being fined £12,000 and banned from five tournaments, while he was also convicted of assault and criminal damage arising from the incident, and was fined £250 by a court.

Another came at the 1990 World Championship; after losing his first-round match to Steve James, he punched tournament official Colin Randle in the abdomen before the start of a press conference at which he announced his retirement, and abused the media as he left. This followed another incident at the World Cup, where he repeatedly argued with fellow player and compatriot Dennis Taylor, and threatened to have him shot. For his conduct, Higgins was banned for the rest of the season and all of the next.

During the World Trickshot Championship in 1991, Higgins referred to the black ball as "Muhammad Ali" in front of a live audience and TV cameras. This caused a visibly pained expression from Barry Hearn and an exclamation from fellow judge Steve Davis.

Outside snooker
At the time of his 1972 triumph at the World Championship, Higgins had no permanent home and by his own account had recently lived in a row of abandoned houses in Blackburn which were awaiting demolition. In one week he had moved into five different houses on the same street, moving down one every time his current dwelling was demolished.

In 1975, Higgins' son was born. Higgins's first marriage was to Cara Hasler in April 1975 in Sydney. They had a daughter Christel and divorced. His second marriage was to Lynn Avison in 1980. They had a daughter Lauren (born late 1980) and son Jordan (born March 1983). They split in 1985 and divorced.  In the same year, Higgins began a relationship with Siobhan Kidd, which ended in 1989 after he allegedly hit her with a hairdryer.

Higgins had a long and enduring friendship with Oliver Reed.

Higgins was the subject of This Is Your Life in 1981 when he was surprised by Eamonn Andrews at the Pot Black Club in London.

In 1983 Higgins helped a young boy from Manchester, a fan of his who had been in a coma for two months. His parents were growing desperate and wrote to Higgins. He recorded messages on tape and sent them to the boy with his best wishes. He later visited the boy in hospital and played a snooker match he promised to have with him when he recovered.

In 1996, Higgins was convicted of assaulting a 14-year-old boy, while in 1997 then-girlfriend Holly Haise stabbed him three times during a domestic argument. He published his autobiography, From the Eye of the Hurricane: My Story, in 2007. Higgins appeared in the Sporting Stars edition of the British television quiz The Weakest Link on 25 July 2009.

Illness and death
For many years, Higgins smoked heavily. He reportedly smoked 80 cigarettes a day. He had cancerous growths removed from his mouth in 1994 and 1996. In June 1998, he was found to have throat cancer; on 13 October of that year, he had major surgery. He could only talk in a whisper in his last years.

In early 2010 he suffered from pneumonia and breathing problems, and on 31 March he was admitted to hospital. In April 2010 Higgins' friends announced that they had set up a campaign to help raise the £20,000 he needed for teeth implants, to enable him to eat properly again and put on weight. Higgins had lost his teeth after intensive radiotherapy used to treat his throat cancer. It was reported that since losing them he had been living on liquid food, and had become increasingly depressed, even contemplating suicide. He was too ill and frail to have the implants fitted. Despite his illness, Higgins continued to smoke cigarettes and drink heavily until the end of his life. He was admitted to hospital again in May.

Despite having once been worth £4 million, he was bankrupt and survived on a £200-a-week disability allowance. He was found dead in bed in his flat on 24 July 2010. The cause of death was a combination of malnutrition, pneumonia, tooth decay and a bronchial condition, although his daughter Lauren stated that he was clear from throat cancer when he died. His children survived him.

Higgins' funeral service was held at St Anne's Cathedral, Belfast, on 2 August 2010. He was buried in Carnmoney Cemetery in Newtownabbey, County Antrim. Among the snooker professionals in attendance were Jimmy White, Willie Thorne, Stephen Hendry, Ken Doherty, Joe Swail, Shaun Murphy and John Virgo. Doherty and White were pall bearers.

Legacy

Alex Higgins was an inspiration to many subsequent professional snooker players, including Ken Doherty, Jimmy White and Ronnie O'Sullivan. In Clive Everton's TV documentary The Story of Snooker (2002), Steve Davis described Higgins as the "one true genius that snooker has produced", although the autobiography of a contemporary leading professional Willie Thorne characterised Higgins as "not a great player". Higgins arguably fulfilled his potential only intermittently during his career peak in the 1970s and 80s; Everton puts this down to Davis and Ray Reardon generally being too consistent for him. O'Sullivan has called Higgins "the greatest snooker player I have ever seen" when he was playing at his best, while also acknowledging that Higgins's erratic lifestyle led to a lack of consistency on the table.

Regardless, Higgins' exciting style and explosive persona helped make snooker a growing television sport in the 1970s and 1980s. Higgins also made the first 16-red clearance (in a challenge match in 1976); it was a break of 146 (with the brown as the first "red", and 16 colours: 1 green, 5 pinks and 10 blacks).

In 2011, Event 8 of the Players Tour Championship was renamed as the Alex Higgins International Trophy. In 2016, WPBSA chairman Barry Hearn announced that the trophy for the new Northern Ireland Open tournament would be named after Higgins.

Higgins' professional rivalry with Steve Davis was portrayed in a 2016 BBC feature film entitled The Rack Pack, in which he was played by Luke Treadaway.

Performance and rankings timeline

Career finals

Ranking finals: 6 (1 title)

Non-ranking finals: 51 (24 titles)

Pro-am finals: 4 (3 titles)

Team finals: 6 (5 titles)

Amateur finals: 3 (2 titles)

Notes

References

Bibliography

Further reading

External links

 Official player profile on worldsnooker.com website
 Alex Higgins: The People's Champion BBC iPlayer. 1 September 2010.
 Profile on Global Snooker
 Alex Higgins 69 Break: Crucible, Sheffield 1982 YouTube. 14 April 20019.
 Higgins and White win the World Doubles Championship 1984 YouTube. 1 September 2009.
 Higgins wins the Canadian Club Masters 1976 YouTube. 26 August 2009.
 Ronnie O'Sullivan reminisces about Alex Higgins BBC Sport. 25 August 2010.

1949 births
2010 deaths
Anglicans from Northern Ireland
Sportspeople from Belfast
Snooker players from Northern Ireland
Masters (snooker) champions
UK champions (snooker)
British people convicted of assault
Winners of the professional snooker world championship